Although the United States Constitution did not use the words "slave" or "slavery", it explicitly protected American slavery in at least five articles and indirectly protected the institution elsewhere in the document.

At the time of the drafting of the Constitution in 1787, and its ratification in 1789, slavery was banned by the states in New England, also Pennsylvania and by the Congress of the Confederation in the Northwest Territory, by the Northwest Ordinance. Though slaves were present in other states, most were forced to work in agriculture in the South. 

According to H. W. Brands, because of the declining productivity of crops like tobacco due to soil exhaustion, many of the drafters of the Constitution assumed that slavery would naturally die out in the South as it had done in industrialized North. This changed after the adoption of the Constitution, with the invention of the modern cotton gin in 1793, which provided a more sustainable and economically viable crop for Southern plantations.

Throughout U.S. history there have been disputes about whether the Constitution was proslavery or antislavery. James Oakes writes that the Constitution's Fugitive Slave Clause and Three-Fifths Clause "might well be considered the bricks and mortar of the proslavery Constitution". "But", Oakes adds, "there was also an antislavery Constitution.... Congress was granted the power to make 'all needful rules and regulations' for the territories, and for decades after ratification hardly anyone doubted that this authorized the federal government to ban slavery from the territories.... Then there was the familiar assertion that the principle of fundamental human equality was embodied in the Constitution.... Doesn't the Preamble state that the purpose of the federal government was to 'secure the blessings of liberty' ... ? Similarly, the Fifth Amendment declares that 'no person' could be deprived of life, liberty, or property without due process of law."

Oakes continues: "Throughout the decades-long debate over slavery and the Constitution some of the most contentious issues arose over constitutional principles that cannot be found in the actual wording of the Constitution. Nowhere does the Constitution state that Congress cannot 'interfere' with slavery or abolition in a state, yet it was widely agreed that it could not. Nor does the Constitution expressly recognize a right of 'property in man'.... Given that the Constitution was the handiwork of men who disagreed about slavery, it is hardly surprising that it could be—and was—read as both proslavery and antislavery." Oakes' view is that, "depending on which clauses you cite and how you spin them, the Constitution can be read as either proslavery or antislavery".

See also
 Three-fifths Compromise
 Act Prohibiting Importation of Slaves
 Fugitive Slave Act of 1793
 Fugitive Slave Act of 1850
 Dred Scott v. Sandford
 Thirteenth Amendment to the United States Constitution

References

Slavery in the United States
United States constitutional law